The 2022–23 Hampton Pirates men's basketball team represented Hampton University in the 2022–23 NCAA Division I men's basketball season. The Pirates, led by 14th-year head coach Edward Joyner, played their home games at the Hampton Convocation Center in Hampton, Virginia as first-year members of the Colonial Athletic Association.

Previous season
The Pirates finished the 2021–22 season 9–19, 5–11 in Big South play to finish in last place in the North division. As the No. 10 seed in the Big South tournament, they lost to High Point in the first round.

The season marked the school's last season as a member of the Big South Conference, as the Pirates joined the Colonial Athletic Association in 2022.

Roster

Schedule and results

|-
!colspan=12 style=| Regular season

|-
!colspan=12 style=| CAA tournament
|-

Sources

References

Hampton Pirates men's basketball seasons
Hampton Pirates
Hampton Pirates men's basketball
Hampton Pirates men's basketball